The 23nd IBU Open European Championships were held in Tyumen, Russia from February 24 to February 28, 2016.

There were total of 8 competitions: single mixed relay, relay mixed, sprint women, sprint men, pursuit women, pursuit men, mass start women and mass start men.

Schedule of events 
The schedule of the event stands below. All times in CET.

Results

Men's

Women's

Mixed

Medal table

References

2016
International sports competitions hosted by Russia
2016 in biathlon
2016 in Russian sport
Sport in Tyumen
Biathlon competitions in Russia